Ryan S. Jhun is a South Korean songwriter and producer. Jhun is known for his work with various K-pop soloists and idol groups, getting his start through acts from SM Entertainment such as Shinee, Super Junior, f(x), Taeyeon, Exo, NCT and TVXQ. He has since produced for several artists from other labels like IU, LOONA, Lee Hyo-ri, U-Kiss, Girl's Day, Twice, and Oh My Girl, as well songs for audition programs Produce 101 and My Teenage Girl.

He founded and became chief executive officer of music production and publishing company Marcan Entertainment. He is also the CEO of Ateam Entertainment, where he produced for the label's groups VAV and BugAboo.

Background and career 
Jhun was born in South Korea on February 28, 1979. He moved to New York at ten years old, where he began being interested in music. He auditioned for SM Entertainment for what would eventually become boy band Shinhwa, however he was discouraged by his parents. He later traveled back to South Korea to submit his demos, with only SM accepting his music. His first released song was "Chitty Chitty Bang Bang" for Lee Hyori's album H-Logic (2010), while his first "hands-on" song was "Lucifer" for Shinee for their album of the same name. Jhun is known for his "crossover" musical style, with his production incorporating elements from world music. He also co-founded songwriting and production teams Marcan Entertainment and Musikade, and regularly collaborates with Denzil Remedios, LDN Noise, and Dem Jointz.

Jhun is also CEO of Ateam Entertainment, having joined in 2017 to produce for their boy group VAV. In 2021, he debuted his first girl group, BugAboo, under Ateam.

Discography

As lead artist

Production Credits

2019
 "Stealer" for Monsta X
 "Thrilla Killa" for VAV
 "Spotlight" for 1THE9
 "Checkmate" for Oh My Girl
 "LP" for Red Velvet
 "Love Is the Way" for Red Velvet
 "Strawberry" for Twice
 "Get Loud" for Twice
 "Boom" for NCT Dream
 "New World" for Victon
 "Touchin'" for Kang Daniel
 "Obsession" for Exo
 "Ya Ya Ya" for Exo
 "Popsicle" for UHSN

2020
 "Eyes" for Iz*One
 "Kick It" for NCT 127
 "Nightmare" for Victon
 "Dolphin" for Oh My Girl
 "100" for SuperM
 "Moon Dance" for NU'EST
 "Punch" for NCT 127
 "Mayday" for Victon
 "After Midnight" for WayV
 "Electric Hearts" for WayV
 "Made For Two" for VAV
 "La Luna" for HA:TFELT
 "Just Me and You" for Taemin
 "Bon Voyage" for YooA
 "Far" for YooA 
 "Abracadabra" for YooA 
 "My Face" for Verivery
 "Santa Lullaby (We Used To Sing)" for Lee Haein

2021
 "What I Said" for Victon
 "Chess" for Victon
 "Carry On" for Kang Seung-sik (Victon)
 "USED TO THIS" for Jang Han-byul
 "Abittipsy" for YOUHA
 "My Turn" for Cravity
 "Mammoth" for Cravity
 "Bad Habits" for Cravity
 "Celebrity" for IU
 "Flu" for IU
 "Don't Call Me" for SHINee
 "I Really Want You" for SHINee
 "Kick Back" for WayV
 "After School" for Weeekly
 "We Are Future" for Mirae
 "Killa" for Mirae
 "Dun Dun Dance" for Oh My Girl
 "Dear You" for Oh My Girl
"My Doll" for Oh My Girl
 "Quest" for Oh My Girl
 "Who Comes Who Knows" for Oh My Girl
 "Swan" for Oh My Girl
 "Strings" for Taemin
 "Sad Kids" for Taemin
 "Easy" for WJSN the Black
 "Like it Hot" for GWSN
 "&" for Loona
 "PTT (Paint the Town)" for Loona
 "Wow" for Loona
 "Be Honest" for Loona 
 "US" for Moon Jong-up
 "GOUP (feat. EK)" for Moon Jong-up
 "B.O.Y (Bet on You)" for The Boyz
 "Maniac" for NCT U (Doyoung, Haechan)
 "Low Low" for WayV - Ten & Yangyang
 "Outsider" for BtoB 
 "Talk & Talk" for Fromis 9
 "Not Friends" for Loona (HeeJin, Kim Lip, JinSoul, Yves)
 "Sticker" for NCT 127
 “Focus” for NCT 127
 “The Rainy Night” for NCT 127
 "Hula Hoop" for Loona
 "Same Same Different" for My Teenage Girl
 "bugAboo" for BugAboo
 "All Night Play" for BugAboo
 "Peaches" for Kai
 "Eleven" for Ive
 "Universe (Let's Play Ball)" for NCT U
 "Zoo" for SM Town (Taeyong, Jeno, Hendery, Yangyang, Giselle)

2022 
 "Step Back" for Girls On Top – Got the Beat
"Feelin' Like" for Pentagon
 "Can't Control Myself" for Taeyeon
 "Tank" for Nmixx
 "Fiesta" for Viviz
 "Love You Like" for Viviz
 "My oh My" for Apink
 "Voyager" for Kihyun
 "Real Love" for Oh My Girl
 "Eden" for Oh My Girl
 "Replay" for Oh My Girl
 "Parachute" for Oh My Girl
 "Kiss & Fix" for Oh My Girl
 "Blink" for Oh My Girl
 "Dear Rose" for Oh My Girl
 "Better Than Gold" for NCT Dream
 "Jaws" for BAE173
 "Breathe" for Monsta X
 "Up" for Classy
 "Shut Down" for Classy
 "Tell Me One More Time" for Classy
 "Super Cool" for Classy
 "Feelin' So Good" for Classy
 "Self Trip" for Minseo
 "First Love" for Cha Eun-woo of Astro
 "Stupid O'Clock" for Victon
 "Easy Move" for BugAboo
 "Girls" for Aespa
 "ICU" for Aespa
 "Mango" for Super Junior
 "Kiss Me Happy" for Ailee
 "Loco" for Ren
 "Feel Something" for Apink ChoBom
 "Bump & Love" for The Boyz
 "After Like" for Ive
 "My Satisfaction" for Ive
 "Thanks To (Listen-Up)" for Rocket Punch
 "Eyes On You" for Kangta
 "Designer" for NCT 127
 "In My Bag" for Jamie
 "Bad Boy, Sad Girl" for Seulgi
 "Hush Rush" for Lee Chaeyeon
 "Danny" for Lee Chaeyeon
 "Aquamarine" for Lee Chaeyeon
 "Same But Different" for Lee Chaeyeon
 "Selfish" for YooA
 "Lay Low" for Yooa
 "Blood Moon" for Yooa
 "Melody" for Yooa

2023 
 "Beautiful Liar" for Monsta X

Filmography

Television show

Awards and nominations

References

External links
 Marcan Entertainment
Ateam Entertainment

1979 births
Living people
South Korean songwriters
South Korean record producers